Ernest Shabaylo (19 December 1931 – 1982) was a Russian equestrian. He competed in two events at the 1960 Summer Olympics.

References

1931 births
1982 deaths
Russian male equestrians
Soviet male equestrians
Olympic equestrians of the Soviet Union
Equestrians at the 1960 Summer Olympics
Sportspeople from Ivanovo